The Nationaal Bus Museum is a transport museum in Hoogezand in the Netherlands. The museum has a collection of Dutch buses. With 27,027 visitors in 2015, it is one of the most-visited museums in the province of Groningen.

Location 
The museum is located at the Produktieweg in the village of Hoogezand, part of the municipality of Hoogezand-Sappemeer, in the province of Groningen in the northeast of the Netherlands.

Collection 
The museum has a collection of buses and bus-related objects from the Netherlands, especially from the northern part of the country.

Administration 

Willem Goelema is chairman of the museum.

The museum had 18,812 visitors in 2013, 28,260 visitors in 2014, and 27,027 visitors in 2015. The visitor numbers are including museum bus rides. It is one of six museums in Groningen with more than 25 thousand visitors in 2015, making it one of the most-visited museums of the province that year.

Since 2015, the museum has been registered in the Museumregister Nederland (Netherlands Museum Register), a quality mark for museums in the Netherlands.

References

External links 

 Nationaal Bus Museum (in Dutch), official website

Bus museums
Transport in Midden-Groningen
Museums in Groningen (province)
Transport museums in the Netherlands